Payne Gap is an unincorporated community and census-designated place in Letcher County, Kentucky, United States. Its population was 329 as of the 2010 census. U.S. Route 119 passes through the community.

Geography

Demographics

References

Unincorporated communities in Letcher County, Kentucky
Unincorporated communities in Kentucky
Census-designated places in Letcher County, Kentucky
Census-designated places in Kentucky